The Eurovision Song Contest 1979 was the 24th edition of the annual Eurovision Song Contest. Organised by the European Broadcasting Union (EBU) and host broadcaster Israeli Broadcasting Authority (IBA), the contest was held at the International Convention Centre on 31 March 1979 and was hosted by Israeli television presenter Daniel Pe'er and singer Yardena Arazi. This was the first time that the Eurovision Song Contest was held outside Europe.

Nineteen countries participated in the contest with  deciding not to participate after Arab countries had pressured it into not participating in a contest held in Israel. , who had missed the 1977 and 1978 contest, also did not want to take part nor transmit the show this year for political reasons, despite a poll held earlier in which almost 100,000 people declared that they wanted Yugoslavia to return to the contest.

For the second year in a row  won with the song "Hallelujah", performed by the Israeli group Milk and Honey featuring Gali Atari.

Location 

The venue, the largest convention center in the Middle East, hosted the contest in the Ussishkin Auditorium which seats an audience of more than 3000 and where it traditionally hosts other musical events including classical and pop stars concerts.

The city's ancient, religious and modern scenery was reflected through a film which opened the broadcast. The city's history as one of the oldest and holiest in the world, was shown through the biblical and medieval monuments and sites sacred to Judaism, Christianity and Islam, as well as visitors and city's residents who frequent them while practicing their faiths. The city's governmental, cultural and educational institutions and monuments, as well as the streets and people outside the ancient wall, were shown at the opening and conclusion of the film.

Format 
The 24th contest's logo featured a combination of a G-clef, the IBA logo, and the names of all participating countries in order of appearance.

The stage concept was designed by Dov Ben David. On stage there was a moving symbol which was based on the IBA logo (which was built like a lamp with 3 concentric rings) using a small projected model.

Since Israeli Television had yet to broadcast in colour at that point (except for a few special occasions), the production had to borrow cameras from the BBC, the same had happened when RTÉ had hosted the 1971 contest in Dublin.

The IBA Symphony Orchestra, directed by conductor Izhak Graziani played the music of each song (except for the Italian entry, which did not use the orchestra). This was the only contest where the orchestra was composed of 39 musicians.

Postcards 
This year, the postcards between each song featured mime artists rather than the participating singers. The mime artists featured were the Yoram Boker Mime Group, and included some of Israel's leading mime artists, among them Ezra Dagan and Hanoch Rozen. The group performed on a background of illustrations created by Dudu Geva and Yochanan Lakitzevitz, that featured landmarks and typical landscapes of the respective countries.

The various themes were as following, listed in appearance order:

 Boats and picnic baskets on a Portuguese beach; The mime performers pretend to pull a giant bottle of Porto Wine.
 A photographer using an old view camera, trying to take a picture of tourists on the background of the Leaning Tower of Pisa, when the tower keeps changing its position.
 A mime performer dressed as Copenhagen's The Little Mermaid Statue, while other figures from famous fairytales by Danish author Hans Christian Andersen (such as The Ugly Duckling) move in the background.
 Mime performers dance in a typical Irish village, with a background of an Irish pub with the sign of Guinness, famous Irish beer brand.
 Mime performers pretending to be ice skating in a snowy Finnish forest.
 A mime performer pretends to be a track marshal waving a flag at the motor racing Grand Prix de Monaco.
 A mime performer dressed as the Discobolus of Myron statue, standing on the Acropolis of Athens. The statue "comes to life" and throws the discus which causes an audible mayhem, and the presenters Yardena Arazi and Daniel Pe'er take a sneak pick from the columns of the Parthenon, "appalled" by the statue's conduct.
 Three mime performers pretend to be wooden figures of a Swiss clock, dancing. In the background there are illustrations of the Swiss Alps, a building shaped as a clock and a structure with a rooster shaped weather vane.
 A typical old German village; A depiction of a scene from the German children's book Max and Moritz. A mime performer pretending to be an old woman cooking, when two others are on the roof, stealing her chicken by fishing it through the chimney. In the background some animals are seen, as well as some creatures from the fairy tales of the German Brothers Grimm.
 Two performers dressed as two of The Twelve Spies carry a big grape cluster, pretending to be walking, when the pictures in the background move to feature the different landscapes of Israel (another performer acts as an orchard worker). Eventually, the scenery changes to a typical Israeli beach, when the two performers take off their biblical style costumes and appear shirtless, wearing modern-day swim trunks.
 An illustration of the famous Paris avenue of Champs-Élysées, with mime performers act as a typical French street painter, alongside a romantic couple dancing - initially with each other, and then joined by a drunk homeless who dances with them.
 The famous painting of The Peasant Wedding, created by Flemish artist Pieter Bruegel the Elder, "comes to life", with mime performers pretending to be the two bakers carrying the tray of bread, each pulling to a different direction and argue. Another performer acts as one of the peasants, asking for more bread.
 Two mime performers play soldiers on a turret of the Grand Ducal Palace of Luxembourg. Initially, they pretend to look out for invaders, but then they pull transistor radios out of the edge of their swords and start dancing to rock 'n' roll music.
 Four mime performers, dressed in old Dutch clothes, pretend to be riding an invisible old kick scooter. The background feature a lot of windmills and some storks sit on them.
 The background features an illustration of an enchanted forest in the snow. Two mime performers, dressed as Trolls from the Scandinavian mythology, dance in the snow, and are joined by a third "troll".
 Three mime performers pretend to be Viking Warriors sailing on a ship, facing a strong wind. The background features illustrations of the Norwegian Fjords.
 Representing the 'changing of the guard at Buckingham Palace, the background features the fence of Buckingham Palace, but instead of the palace, beyond fence there are famous London landmarks, such as the Big Ben and St Paul's Cathedral. A mime performer, dressed as an old English banker, reads a newspaper, when a life-size cardboard figure of the Queen's Guard is placed next to him. Another performer, dressed as a sculptor, places another guard figure and salutes it. He then takes the other guard figure, while the other figure suddenly "comes to life" when another performer is dressed as a guard, picking at the banker's newspaper.
 A mime performer dressed as a violinist pretends to be playing an invisible violin in a classical ballroom, and two other performers dance a Viennese Waltz. In the background there are illustrations of spectators.
 The background features a typical Spanish bullfighting arena. One mime performer is dressed as a matador, holding a red cloth and pretends to be fighting an invisible bull. Another performer is dressed as a banderillero, while three others are dressed as spectators in the audience. There are also real hats moving on the heads of some of the illustrated spectators.

Interval act 
The intermission between the songs and the voting was presented by a performance of the Shalom '79 Dancing Ensemble, who danced to a medley of Israeli Folk Dances. The performance was directed by the ensemble's manager and choreographer Gavri Levy.

Participating countries 
At one point before the contest Turkey had planned to participate. The country would have appeared 11th on stage (between Israel and France), represented by Maria Rita Epik and 21. Peron with the song "Seviyorum" ("I'm Loving"). However, Turkey later ended up withdrawing from the contest following pressure from Arab states, who objected to a predominantly Muslim country taking part in a contest held in Israel. Turkey did, however, take part in the contest held in Jerusalem in 1999.

As well as being broadcast live in the 19 competing countries, the contest was also broadcast in Romania, Hong Kong and Iceland.

Conductors 
Each performance had a conductor who conducted the orchestra, except Italy.

 
 N/A
 Allan Botschinsky
 Proinnsías Ó Duinn
 Ossi Runne
 
 
 Rolf Zuckowski
 Norbert Daum
 Kobi Oshrat
 Guy Mattéoni
 Francis Bay
 Hervé Roy
 Harry van Hoof
 Lars Samuelson
 Sigurd Jansen
 Ken Jones
 Richard Oesterreicher
 José Luis Navarro

Returning artists 
Bold indicates a previous winner

Participants and results 

The following tables reflect the confirmed, verified scores, which were adjusted after the live broadcast. During the voting announcement, due to a misunderstanding by the presenter Yardena Arazi, Spain appeared to award 10 points to both Portugal and Israel and these scores were added to the scoreboard. After the programme, verification confirmed that Portugal should only have received six points, leaving the total Portuguese score reduced by four points to 64.

Detailed voting results 

Each country had a jury who awarded 12, 10, 8, 7, 6, 5, 4, 3, 2, 1 point(s) for their top ten songs. This was the last year in which the points were announced via order of appearance, as opposed to order of preference. From the next year's contest onwards, the points were announced in ascending order instead. This has remained in place ever since. 

The voting was extremely close. Israel gained a good lead in the early stages of the voting, but Spain eventually caught up and took a good lead themselves. At the close of the penultimate jury's votes, Israel were one point behind Spain, and only the Spanish jury had yet to give their votes. Spain ended up giving Israel 10 points, causing the crowd to erupt into enormous cheers.

12 points 
Below is a summary of all 12 points in the final:

Spokespersons 

Listed below is the order in which votes were cast during the 1979 contest along with the spokesperson who was responsible for announcing the votes for their respective country.

 João Abel Fonseca
 
 
 David Heffernan
 Kaarina Pönniö
 Carole Chabrier
 Niki Venega
 Michel Stocker
 
 
 Denise Fabre
 An Ploegaerts
 Jacques Harvey
 Ivo Niehe
 Sven Lindahl
 
 Colin Berry

Broadcasts 

Each participating broadcaster was required to relay the contest via its networks. Non-participating EBU member broadcasters were also able to relay the contest as "passive participants". Broadcasters were able to send commentators to provide coverage of the contest in their own native language and to relay information about the artists and songs to their television viewers.

Known details on the broadcasts in each country, including the specific broadcasting stations and commentators are shown in the tables below. In addition to the participating countries, the contest was also reportedly broadcast in Hong Kong, Iceland and Romania. The contest was not broadcast in Yugoslavia for the first time since 1961, as the nation had no diplomatic ties with Israel.

See also 
 OTI Festival 1979

Notes

References

External links

 

 
1979
1979 in Europe
1979 in Israel
1979 in music
Events in Jerusalem
March 1979 events in Asia
Music festivals in Israel
Music in Jerusalem
1970s in Jerusalem